House of Schivas is an L-plan tower house, dating from the 16th century, about three miles east of Methlick, in the valley of the River Ythan, in Aberdeenshire, Scotland.

History

The land was owned by Schivas of that Ilk in the 14th century, but it passed through heiresses to the Lipp family, and then to the Maitland family.  George, Lord Gordon came into possession of the lands in 1467, but Thomas Gray of Scheves occupied the land by 1509.  It is thought that this family built the present castle.

By 1721 the Forbes family owned the castle, and altered it internally.  It had become a farmhouse by the late 19th century.  After it was burned out in 1900, it was restored for Lord Aberdeen by Sydney Mitchell, in 1902.  Thomas Catto, 1st Baron Catto subsequently had the castle embellished by J Fenton Wyness, an antiquarian architect.

The original building has been attributed to Thomas Leper, around 1585. The north-east tower, three storeys high, was added in about 1750, by the Forbeses, and a western extension to the main block in 1780.

Structure

House of Schivas is a tall tower house.  A modern courtyard surrounds it, replacing the original.  A wide circular stair tower projecting from the north front of the main block gives access to all floors, while a stair tower in the re-entrant angle rises from the first floor level.  There is a modern timber re-entrant angle turret.

The wing is offset to the east a little, probably to give additional protection to the entrance of the re-entrant angle.  The main doorway has four groups of shot holes of differing forms around it. The kitchen is in the vaulted basement, from which a vaulted passage leads to two cellars.

The hall is panelled in sequoia wood, and has aumbries, a garderobe and a chapel recess with a crucifix and the monogram I.H.S.

It is a category B listed building.

References

Castles in Aberdeenshire
Category B listed buildings in Aberdeenshire
Listed castles in Scotland